The occupation of the Student Union Building was one of the most talked about events in Sweden in 1968. Students at Stockholm University decided to occupy the Stockholm University Student Union's building at Holländargatan in Stockholm on 24–27 May 1968 to send a political message to the government.

The students were inspired by the protests of May 1968 in France but used less violence. This was one of many political protests in 1968.

Borgerliga Studenter – Opposition '68 was created as a reaction against the leftist students. The building itself is today part of the Stockholm School of Economics.

See also
Occupation of the Old Student House

Sources

Stockholm University
1968 in politics
1968 in Sweden
Education in Sweden
Protests in Sweden
Student protests in Europe
1960s in Stockholm
May 1968 events in Europe
1968 protests